Bartošovice is a municipality and village in Nový Jičín District in the Moravian-Silesian Region of the Czech Republic. It has about 1,700 inhabitants.

Administrative parts

The village of Hukovice is an administrative part of Bartošovice.

Notable people
Lev Skrbenský z Hříště (1863–1938), Cardinal of the Catholic Church

References

External links

Villages in Nový Jičín District